Bruguière Peak is the sharp rocky peak rising to  near the end of the side ridge that trends  northeastwards from Mount Giovinetto on the main crest of north-central Sentinel Range in Ellsworth Mountains, Antarctica.  It surmounts Rumyana Glacier to the southeast and Delyo Glacier to the northwest.

The peak is named after the French zoologist Jean Guillaume Bruguière (1750-1798) who sailed with Yves-Joseph de Kerguelen-Trémarec to Kerguelen Islands in 1772, becoming the first scientist after Edmund Halley to visit the Antarctic region.

Location
US mapping in 1961 and 1988.

See also
 Mountains in Antarctica

Maps
 Vinson Massif.  Scale 1:250 000 topographic map.  Reston, Virginia: US Geological Survey, 1988.
 Antarctic Digital Database (ADD). Scale 1:250000 topographic map of Antarctica. Scientific Committee on Antarctic Research (SCAR). Since 1993, regularly updated.

Notes

References
 Bruguière Peak. SCAR Composite Gazetteer of Antarctica.
 Bulgarian Antarctic Gazetteer. Antarctic Place-names Commission. (details in Bulgarian, basic data in English)

External links
 Bruguière Peak. Copernix satellite image

Ellsworth Mountains
Bulgaria and the Antarctic
Mountains of Ellsworth Land